India was represented at the 2006 Commonwealth Games in Melbourne by a 270-member strong contingent comprising 183 sportspersons and 77 officials. 2004 Summer Olympics silver medalist Rajyavardhan Singh Rathore was the flag bearer for India.

Samresh Jung was chosen as the winner of the inaugural David Dixon Award, which honours the outstanding athlete at each Commonwealth Games. Jung won seven medals at the 2006 Games, five gold, one silver and one bronze and set three new Games records along the way. As in the previous 2002 Commonwealth Games, India came fourth overall in the medals table, behind Australia, England and Canada.

Medals

{| class="wikitable" style="text-align:center; font-size:85%; float:right"
|- style="background:#efefef;"
!colspan=5|Medals by sport
|- align=center
|Sport
! style="background:#f7f6a8;"|
! style="background:#dce5e5;"|
! style="background:#ffdab9;"|
!Total
|- align=center
|align=left|Shooting|| style="background:#f7f6a8;"|16|| style="background:#dce5e5;"|7|| style="background:#ffdab9;"|4||27
|- align=center
|align=left|Weightlifting || style="background:#f7f6a8;"|3|| style="background:#dce5e5;"|5|| style="background:#ffdab9;"|1||9
|- align=center
|align=left|Table tennis|| style="background:#f7f6a8;"|2|| style="background:#dce5e5;"|0|| style="background:#ffdab9;"|1||3
|- align=center
|align=left|Boxing|| style="background:#f7f6a8;"|1|| style="background:#dce5e5;"|2|| style="background:#ffdab9;"|2||5
|- align=center
|align=left|Athletics|| style="background:#f7f6a8;"|0|| style="background:#dce5e5;"|2|| style="background:#ffdab9;"|1||3
|- align=center
|align=left|Hockey|| style="background:#f7f6a8;"|0|| style="background:#dce5e5;"|1|| style="background:#ffdab9;"|0||1
|- align=center
|align=left|Badminton|| style="background:#f7f6a8;"|0|| style="background:#dce5e5;"|0|| style="background:#ffdab9;"|2||2
|- 
|- align=center
! style="background:#efefef;"|Total
! style="background:gold;" |22! style="background:silver;" |17! style="background:#c96;"|11|50|}

{| class="wikitable sortable" style="font-size:90%"
|-
! Medal
! Name
! Sport
! Event
! Date
|-
| |  || Vijay Kumar Pemba Tamang|| Shooting || Men's 25 metre Rapid Fire Pistol (Pairs) || 18 March
|-
|  || Vijay Kumar Pemba Tamang|| Shooting || Men's 25 metre Rapid Fire Pistol (Pairs) || 19 March
|-
|  || Gagan Narang Abhinav Bindra || Shooting || Men's 50m Air rifle pairs || 20 March
|-
|  || Tejaswini Sawant || Shooting || Women's 10m Air rifle pairs || 20 March
|-
|  ||Samaresh Jung ||Shooting || Men's 50m Pistol || 21 March
|-
|  || Gagan Narang || Shooting || Men's 10m Air rifle pairs || 21 March
|-
|
GoldShooting:Samaresh Jung and Jaspal Rana, Men's 25m Centre Fire Pistol (Pairs)
, Men's 10m Air Pistol (Pairs)
Samaresh Jung and Ronak Pandit, Men's 25m Standard Pistol (Pairs)
Tejaswini Sawant and Avneet Sidhu, Women's 10m Air Rifle (Pairs)
Abhinav Bindra and Gagan Narang, Men's 10m Air Rifle (Pairs)
Saroja Jhuthu and Sushma Rana, Women's 25m Pistol (Pairs)
Anuja Jung,  Women's 50m Rifle 3 Positions
Samresh Jung,  Men's 10m Air Pistol
Vijay Kumar,  Men's 25m Rapid Fire Pistol
Rajyavardhan Singh Rathore,  Men's Double Trap
Gagan Narang,  Men's 50m Rifle 3 PositionsWeightlifting:Yumnam Chanu, Women's 58 kg
Kunjarani Devi, Women's 48 kg
Geeta Rani, Women's +75 kgTable Tennis:Sharath Kamal, Men's Singles
Men's Team EventBoxing:Akhil Kumar,  Bantamweight 54 kg

SilverShooting:Avneet Kaur Sidhu, Women's 10m Air Rifle
Samresh Jung and Vivek Singh, Men's 50m Pistol (Pairs)
Rajyavardhan Singh Rathore and Vikram Bhatnagar, Men's Double Trap (Pairs)
Anjali Bhagwat and Anuja Jung, Women's 50m Rifle 3 Positions (Pairs)
Pemba Tamang,  Men's 25m Rapid Fire Pistol
Vivek Singh,  Men's 10m Air Pistol
Abhinav Bindra,  Men's 50m Rifle 3 PositionsWeightlifting:Vicky Batta, Women's 56 kg
Arun Murugesan, Men's 62 kg
Laishram Monika Devi, Women's 69 kg
Simple Kaur BHUMRAH, Women's +75 kg
ASDULLAH Mohammed Zakir, Men's 77 kgAthletics:Seema Antil, Women's Discus Throw
Women's 4 × 400 m RelayBoxing:Vijender Kumar, Welterweight 69 kg
Harpreet Singh, Heavyweight 91 kgHockey:India women's national field hockey team

BronzeBadminton:Chetan Anand, Men's Singles
Mixed Team EventTable Tennis:Women's Team EventShooting:Abhinav Bindra, Men's 10m Air Rifle
Manavjit Singh Sandhu,  Men's Trap
Samresh Jung,  Men's 25m Centre Fire Pistol
Sanjeev Rajput,  Men's 50m rifle proneWeightlifting:Sudhir Kumar Chitradurga, Men's 69 kgAthletics:Ranjith Kumar Jayaseelan,  Men's Seated Discus Throw EADBoxing:Jitender Kumar,  Flyweight 51 kg
Varghese Johnson,  Super Heavyweight +91 kg

India's Teams at the 2006 Commonwealth Games

Field Hockey

Men's team
 Gokhul shankar
 Deepak Thakur
 Kanwalpreet Singh
 Sandeep Singh
 Tejbir Singh
 Ignace Tirkey
 Prabodh Tirkey
 Didar Singh
 Baljit Singh
 Rajpal Singh
 Sardara Singh
 Viren Rasquinha
 Arjun Halappa
 William Xallxo
 Vikram Pillay
 Tushar Khandekar
 BalajiHead coach: Rajinder Singh

Women's team
 Helen Mary
 Kanti Baa
 Nilima Kujur
 Rajwinder Kaur
 Sumrai Tete
 Masira Surin
 Subhadra Pradhan
 Asunta Lakra
 Jyoti Sunita Kullu
 Mamta Kharab
 Jasjeet Kaur Handa
 Surinder Kaur
 Saba Anjum Karim
 Sanggai Chanu
 Sarita Lakra
 Rajni BalaHead coach''': Maharaj Krishan Kaushik

References

External links
 Medal Winners for India, Official listing Melbourne Commonwealth Games website.

India at the Commonwealth Games
Nations at the 2006 Commonwealth Games
Commonwealth Games